Caruth may refer to:

Places
Caruth, Missouri, unincorporated community in Dunklin County

People
Asher G. Caruth
Cathy Caruth
Don Caruth

See also
Carruth (disambiguation)